Obernkirchen is a town in the district of Schaumburg, in Lower Saxony, Germany. It is situated approximately 8 km southwest of Stadthagen, and 15 km east of Minden.

Obernkirchen is a small town in the shadows of the Bückeberg, a hill range in the Weser Uplands.  It overlooks the vast lower lying part of the old county of Schaumburg Lippe, now the district of Schaumburg, with the town of Bückeburg at its feet.

People 
 August Oetker (1862-1918), inventor, food scientist and businessman

References

External links
 Obernkirchen Children's Choir

Towns in Lower Saxony
Schaumburg